Auckland Council is the local government council for the Auckland Region in New Zealand. It is a territorial authority that has the responsibilities, duties and powers of a regional council and so is a unitary authority, according to the Local Government (Auckland Council) Act 2009, which established the council. The governing body consists of a mayor and 20 councillors, elected from 13 wards. There are also 149 members of 21 local boards who make decisions on matters local to their communities. It is the largest council in Oceania, with a $3 billion annual budget, $29 billion of ratepayer equity, and 9,870 full-time staff as of 30 June 2016. The council began operating on 1 November 2010, combining the functions of the previous regional council and the region's seven city and district councils into one "super council" or "super city".

The council was established by a number of Acts of Parliament, and an Auckland Transition Agency, also created by the central government. Both the means by which the council was established and its structure came under repeated criticism from a broad spectrum during the establishment period.

The initial Council elections in October 2010 returned a mostly centre-left council with Len Brown as mayor. Brown was re-elected in October 2013, again with a largely supportive council. The 2016 mayoral election was won by Labour MP Phil Goff, who had a landslide victory over his nearest rivals, Victoria Crone and future Green Party MP Chlöe Swarbrick. Goff won re-election in the 2019 mayoral election and chose not to run in the 2022 mayoral election, which was won by Wayne Brown.

Predecessors 
The Auckland Council took over the functions of the Auckland Regional Council and the region's seven city and district councils: Auckland City Council, Manukau City Council, Waitakere City Council, North Shore City Council, Papakura District Council, Rodney District Council and most of Franklin District Council.

The Auckland Regional Council was formed in 1989, replacing the Auckland Regional Authority. One of the mainstays of its work was expanding the parks network, and it brought into the Auckland Council 26 regional parks with more than 40,000 hectares, including many restored natural habitats and sanctuaries developed in co-operation with the Department of Conservation and volunteers. A variety of often public transport-focused projects like the Northern Busway as well as significant rail and public transport investments were realised through the Auckland Regional Transport Authority, much of it supported by retaining Ports of Auckland in public hands (after the deregulation of the Auckland Harbour Board) to fund the improvements with the dividends.

History

Royal Commission 
Until 2010, the Auckland Region had seven "City/District" authorities, plus one "Regional" authority. In the late 2000s, New Zealand's central government and parts of Auckland's society felt that this large number of Councils, and the lack of strong regional government (with the Auckland Regional Council only having limited powers) were hindering Auckland's progress, and that a form of stronger regional government, or an amalgamation under one local council, would be beneficial. Others pointed to the fact that a previous integration of the many much smaller Borough Councils did not bring the promised advantages either, and reduced local participation in politics, with editorialists pointing out that the (supposedly mainly Wellingtonian) proponents of the 'super city' have carefully not made any promises of savings in light of past rises in rates and utilities bills.

In 2007, the government set up a Royal Commission on Auckland Governance to report on what restructuring should be done. The report was released on 27 March 2009 and the government subsequently announced that a "super city" would be set up to include the full metropolitan area under an Auckland Council with a single mayor and 20–30 local boards, by the time of the local body elections in 2010, though it also changed some key recommendations of the Royal Commission.

Unimplemented recommendations
Some recommendations of the Royal Commission which have not been adopted or implemented:
 6A The Auckland Council should include a vision for the region in its spatial plan.
 6B The Mayor of Auckland's annual "State of the Region" address should describe progress towards the attainment of the vision.
 19C: "Leadership support and development programmes for elected councillors should be strengthened."
 21D: Auckland Council CCOs and their statements of intent should be subject to performance review by the proposed Auckland Services Performance Auditor.
 21A 22A Two Māori members should be elected to the Auckland Council by voters who are on the parliamentary Māori Electoral Roll.

 22B There should be a Mana Whenua Forum, the members of which will be appointed by mana whenua from the district of the Auckland Council.
 22D The Auckland Council should ensure that each local council has adequate structures in place to enable proper engagement with Māori and consideration of their views in the local councils' decision-making processes. Where appropriate, current structures and/or memoranda of understanding should be transferred to local councils.
 24F Auckland Council should consider creating an Urban Development Agency, to operate at the direction of the Auckland Council, with compulsory acquisition powers.
 The Auckland Council should determine the extent to which responsibilities for the delivery of stormwater services are shared between local councils and Watercare Services Limited.
 26I Watercare Services Limited should be required by legislation to promote demand management.
 26M Watercare Services Limited should be required to prepare a stormwater action plan.
 27D The Auckland Council should prepare an e-government strategy as an intrinsic part of its proposed unified service delivery and information systems plan.
 28A The Auckland Council should work closely with consumers, the industry, and central government agencies to develop a climate change and energy strategy for the region, including monitoring and reviewing electricity security of supply performance, and industry planning and regulation impacting the Auckland region.
 30A The Auckland Council should develop a Regional Waste Management Strategy, including strategies for management of organic waste and integration of waste management with other environmental programmes.
 32F To promote the widespread adoption of the unified service delivery framework the Auckland Council should
a) give Auckland Council CCOs providing council services the opportunity to share the unified service facilities if they wish.
b) require Auckland Council CCOs providing council services to adopt the council's ICT infrastructure standards.
 32G A statutory position of an independent Auckland Services Performance Auditor (to be appointed by the elected Auckland Council on the joint recommendation of the Chair of the Commerce Commission and the Auditor-General) should be created to provide assurance to the council and the public that the Auckland Council is providing high-quality services in a cost-effective way. The role of the Performance Auditor will include
a) reviewing the adequacy and relevance of CCO performance targets.
b) protecting the consumer's interests and advocating for them in respect of the reliability and affordability of council services. This will include reviewing services in terms of established customer service standards.
c) in the case of Watercare Services Limited, undertaking three-yearly efficiency and effectiveness reviews, incorporating international comparative industry benchmarking and an evaluation of service levels, efficiency, affordability of water, and demand management performance.

Legislation
The council was set up by three pieces of legislation, the Local Government (Tamaki Makaurau Reorganisation) Act 2009, the Local Government (Auckland Council) Act 2009 and the Local Government (Auckland Transitional Provisions) Act 2010.

Structure

Mayor

The mayor has significant executive powers, their own staff and the ability to appoint the chairpersons of the council's committees. Some columnists stated in 2010 that the post was the second most powerful public position in New Zealand after the prime minister. However, when the Minister for the Rugby World Cup, Murray McCully, took control of the Rugby World Cup fan area on the Auckland waterfront in 2011 without first notifying mayor Len Brown, columnist John Armstrong declared the myth finished.

The mayor is directly elected by voters living in the Auckland Council area every three years by postal ballot using the first-past-the-post voting system. Len Brown was elected mayor in October 2010, and re-elected for a second term in 2013. Phil Goff won the 2016 election and was re-elected as mayor in 2019.

Governing body

The governing body of the Auckland Council consists of the mayor, deputy mayor, and 19 other members. The members of the governing body are elected from thirteen wards across the Council area using the first-past-the-post system every three years at the same time as the mayor. Decision-making for the governing body's areas of oversight is done by committees, a few of which consist of the whole governing body, and most of which consist of a chairperson appointed by the mayor and a subset of the governing body members. The following council took office during October 2022:

Wards and local boards

Council-controlled organisations
Auckland Council has substantive CCOs and a number of smaller ones.

Pānuku Development Auckland resulted from a merging of Auckland Council Property Ltd and Waterfront Auckland on 1 September 2015.

Auckland Council Investments Limited (ACIL) was disestablished in 2019 as part of the 10-year budget 2018–2028.

Michael Redman, formerly mayor, then chief executive of Hamilton City Council, was chief executive of Auckland Tourism, Events and Economic Development from November 2010 to October 2011.

Chief executive
In March 2010, Doug McKay was announced as the inaugural chief executive officer of the council by the Auckland Transition Agency. The 54-year-old was selected ahead of 27 other candidates, including several existing council chief executives. He had no experience in local government, but was described as having strong Auckland ties, and 30 years' corporate experience. He was to receive a salary of $675,000 and an incentive bonus of $67,500.

Left-wing political organiser Matt McCarten criticised his appointment, arguing McKay's previous tenure in the liquor industry was marked by failure to object to anti-union behaviour and strong advertising of alcohol to the youth market. McCarten argued McKay was to be paid three times the salary of the Prime Minister, had no local government or non-profit experience and was selected by an unelected transition authority.

Mayoral candidates John Banks and Len Brown were positive about McKay's appointment. Brown, who went on to become mayor, said McKay's business and restructuring experience was a "good fit", and would help improve economic performance as well as build links with businesses. McKay's contract ended in December 2013.

Stephen Town became chief executive on 15 January 2014. In early February 2020, Town announced he would not see out his term until December 2020, moving to the New Zealand Institute of Skills & Technology in early July.

Planning documents 

Auckland Plan

It is intended that the Auckland Council, as one of the major tasks of its first years, will prepare a "spatial plan" to guide Auckland's growth. This plan will cover matters such as the limits of residential development and the zoning and densities of the suburbs and areas, and will assess how elements like transport and land use are to be linked. It is intended to be one of the main documents out of which a unified District Plan will eventually grow. Some critics have noted that this spatial plan will need years to develop and CCOs would fill the policy vacuum in the meantime. Apart from conflicting with Council's plans, this might also pit CCOs against each other.

After the first round of plan development and public consultation, the draft plan was launched mid-2011. Commentators noted that one of the strongest discrepancies between Auckland Council's vision for Auckland and that of the John Key-led Wellington government was that the draft Auckland Plan envisaged a more contained growth (combatting sprawl by having 75% of population growth occur in existing settlement areas), while National is more favourable of relaxing constraints on new greenfields development. Auckland Council later changed the plan to allow 30–40% of growth in greenfield areas and satellite towns.

Long Term Council Community Plan

The first Long Term Council Community Plan (LTCCP), the longer-term financial budget of the city, will not be produced until July 2012. Until that time, longer-term finances will be decided by the council, guided by the existing LTCCPs of the subsumed bodies.

City Centre and Waterfront Plans

Another big focus of the planning work in the first year of the council is planning for the Auckland CBD (now called 'City Centre') and the Auckland waterfront. Including the under construction City Rail Link, these two transformations are costed at approximately $5.5 billion over 20 years. Projects proposed in the draft plans include partial or full pedestrianisation of a number of city centre streets, light rail possibilities for the Waterfront and Queen Street, turning Nelson and Hobson Street from wide one-way roads into two-way roads with more trees and urban amenity, and a waterfront walk- and cycleway.

Assets 

The Council owns approximately $34 billion of assets (2010), including over 100,000 hectares of open space, parks and reserves, as well as the large transport assets administered by the Auckland Transport CCO (see that article for more detail).

Auckland Council Investments Limited (ACIL), the CCO responsible for non-transport investment assets, manages Council investments worth $2.54 billion, including a 22.4% stake in Auckland Airport worth $1.13 billion, as well as a 100% share of Ports of Auckland Limited worth $1.08 billion, and Auckland Film Studios, worth $8 million (values at May 2014).

Regional parks

The council owns and manages 28 regional parks around the region. Most of the parks were inherited from Auckland Regional Council.

 Ambury Regional Park
 Ātiu Creek Regional Park
 Auckland Botanic Gardens
 Āwhitu Regional Park
 Duder Regional Park
 Glenfern Sanctuary Regional Park
 Hunua Ranges Regional Park
 Long Bay Regional Park
 Mahurangi Regional Park
 Motukorea Browns Island Regional Park
 Muriwai Regional Park
 Mutukaroa / Hamlins Hill Regional Park
 Ōmana Regional Park
 Orere Point Regional Park
 Pākiri Regional Park
 Scandrett Regional Park
 Shakespear Regional Park
 Tāpapakanga Regional Park
 Tāwharanui Regional Park
 Tawhitokino Regional Park
 Te Ārai Regional Park
 Te Rau Pūriri Regional Park
 Waharau Regional Park
 Waitākere Ranges Regional Park
 Waitawa Regional Park
 Wenderholm Regional Park
 Whakanewha Regional Park
 Whakatīwai Regional Park

Finances

Rates 
Auckland Council rates combine the rates of the various amalgamated local councils and the Auckland Regional Council rates. For the 2011–2012 year, ratepayers are being charged the same rate as before the amalgamation, plus a 3.94% increase, with Council noting that they had achieved a much lower rates increase than originally foreseen. Rates made up 53% of Council's income in 2011, with the remainder being "grants, subsidies, development and financial contributions, user charges and fees".

As of 2011, 24% of Council's money was spent on "Art services and galleries, events, museums, parks, recreation facilities and the zoo", while 22% was spent on "transport management". Further big elements were "Planning and regulation" at 14.5% and "Community services, libraries, emergency management and cemeteries" at 11.5%.

As of 2016, 38% of rates were spent on "transport", 27% on "parks, community and lifestyle", 16% on "environmental management and regulation", 8% on "Auckland development", 6% on "Economic and cultural development" and 5% on "governance and support".

Controversies
Some aspects of the reorganisation were contentious, such as whether all of the Auckland Region should be integrated into the super city, and whether the new structure allowed sufficient local democracy.

Local board powers
Critics argued that there was little space for "local" democracy in the new "local government" setup for Auckland, with the proposed "local boards" having little power, such as having no funding or staff of their own, and being forbidden from undertaking numerous government roles, especially where those roles might clash with regional functions such as transport or utilities. Local Government Minister Rodney Hide, in the opinion of The New Zealand Herald, ignored concerns about the "powerlessness" of the local boards. Hide argued that "local boards will engage like never before" and "represent their local communities and make decisions on local issues, activities and facilities".

A further concern was that candidates for local boards would have to campaign without knowing the scope of the local board's financial resources, and that a salary for a local board member of around $37,100 was insufficient for what amounted to a full-time position.

Inclusion of rural areas
Numerous residents of and (to some degree) the councils of the Franklin and Rodney Districts opposed their inclusion in the new supercity, and instead campaigned for retention of their councils, or inclusion with other, more rural-focused councils in the north (such as merging the areas north of Puhoi with the Kaipara District area) or the south.

There was a perception that these rural areas would receive very little benefit in terms of infrastructure for their rates money, and that they would be swallowed up by an Auckland that has different interests and character than their communities. Politicians such as Rodney Hide answered that inclusion is necessary to allow a regional approach to the wider interests of the region, and that tangible benefits would ensue for all of Auckland's communities. Also, that changing the boundaries in 2010 would have a domino effect on the restructuring of the ward system for the future Auckland councillors. In turn, the opponents of inclusion argued that big city developers preferred the inclusion of the rural areas in the Auckland Council boundaries to make development and new subdivision of rural land easier.

Ward sizes and boundaries
Several editorialists criticised the size and composition of wards for the election of Auckland Council councillors. The criticism ranged from the wards being too big (and thus throwing together communities with few common interests), to some ward boundary lines being drawn against the local understanding of what constituted their community.

More serious criticism was centred around the fact that urban wards contained significantly more people than some rural wards (and thus received less influence in the future Council per person) and in regards to the small number of Councillors for all of Auckland (with fewer Councillors per head than Aucklanders have MPs representing them in Parliament), and the institution of two-member wards (meaning that contenders would have to field much larger and more costly election campaigns). Editorialist Brian Rudman accused the Local Government Commission of attempted gerrymandering in its draft proposal for one particular ward.

Controversies over council-controlled organisations
In early 2010 a further dispute emerged. As set out in the third bill establishing the future Auckland Council, major functions (such as transport, water services and Auckland waterfront development) were to be devolved into council-controlled organisations (CCOs) controlled by unelected boards, operating at "arm's length" from Council. This separation, as argued by backers of the move, had become necessary due to "local politicians [having] failed to deliver the results expected of them."

The Government's plan to outsource the majority of the council's functions was decried by numerous people (including the main mayoral contenders, Len Brown, and to a lesser degree, John Banks) and groups across the political and societal spectrum – from the Auckland Regional Council and many community boards, to Local Government New Zealand, and organisations considered to be National Party-friendly such as the Auckland Chamber of Commerce and the Employers & Manufacturers Association. Supporters included the New Zealand Council for Infrastructure Development, a right-wing think tank.

The introduction of Auckland Transport, the CCO for transport functions (with more than half the city's future rate spend), was discouraged even by the government's own Treasury and Department of Internal Affairs, as well as other departments.

The main proponents of the CCO system, Prime Minister John Key, Local Government Minister Rodney Hide and Transport Minister Steven Joyce, remained adamant about the introduction (and the appropriateness) of the system. Others like the New Zealand Council for Infrastructure Development called the claim that the mayor and council would have no ability to hold the CCOs accountable "farcial nonsense".

The New Zealand Herald, Auckland's largest newspaper, ran a series of articles and editorials in March 2010 criticising the proposed move, which was described as "The lockout of Auckland", arguing that elected councillors would have little control over the day-to-day decisions, and potentially even over massive changes such as Auckland's waterfront development or the city's transport focus. The main Herald editorials noted that the CCO concept introduced "undemocratic elements" in a number of ways, and "could not stand". They also noted that saddling the super city with this system would be the most serious handicap, and a recipe for a "frustrated and disappointed citizenry".

Several editorialists went even further and accused the ACT party, and especially Rodney Hide, of preparing Auckland's assets for a sell-off, and of setting up the structure to allow it even before Aucklanders got to vote on the matter – all under the guise of a "manufactured crisis". Others, while criticising the lack of democratic oversight, dismissed concerns about asset sales, noting that amalgamation was likely to result in surplus real estate.

The Sunday Star-Times noted in an editorial that "we'll merely end up trading in political dysfunction for a quasi-commercial dysfunction forced on us by the National-led government." It also criticised, in the case of Auckland Transport, that with most of the expertise, staff and planning ability being held in the "semi-autonomous" CCO, the council would not have the central planning and policy role as claimed by the proponents of the system, but would instead have to share (or compete for) this role with Auckland Transport. It also argued that the Royal Commission suggested a strong council and subservient CCOs, not vice versa.

New Zealand Local Government magazine followed the story, and criticised the lack of transparency that would ensue from establishing independent CCOs.

The changes were seen as a potential "neutering" of the power of the new Auckland mayor to implement the policies on which he would be elected. Further criticised were lack of accountability of the proposed CCOs, which would not have to hold public board meetings, or provide agendas or minutes. Groups such as 'Heart of the City' (the Auckland CBD business association) also called for stronger oversight and mayoral powers over the CCOs.

Unelected Māori representation

One of the proposals that was hotly criticised by some during the initial Royal Commission proposal was the provision of elected Māori members of the council (analogous to the Māori seat representation in Parliament).

This was later dropped from the relevant establishing laws. However, it later became clear that instead, the city's new Māori Statutory Board, appointed by the Maori Affairs Department, would receive "broadly ordained powers". These included the right to send one or two delegates, with full voting powers, to any council committee meeting, and dealing with "the management and stewardship of natural and physical resources". This unelected representation of Māori on committees voting on matters such as transport and infrastructure, as well as the fact that the advisory board requested (and initially received) a $3.4 million yearly budget (called "exorbitant" by some), created significant public concern and debate.

Proposed Lauren Southern and Stefan Molyneux speaking event
In early July 2018, Mayor Phil Goff announced that the far right Canadian speakers Lauren Southern and Stefan Molyneux would not be allowed to speak at any Auckland Council premises on the grounds that their presence would stir up religious and ethnic tensions. The two Canadian speakers are known for their controversial views on feminism, gender, Islam, and migration. Southern and Molyneux had booked the Bruce Mason Centre in the North Shore for a speaking event on 3 August 2018.

In response to the Mayor's decision, a group calling themselves the Free Speech Coalition initiated a fundraising campaign to mount a judicial review of the Auckland Council's decision, raising NZ$50,000 within 24 hours of their launch. This group consisted of several business leaders, academics, lawyers, and journalists including the former Labour President Michael Bassett, former National and ACT parties leader Don Brash, Property Institute chief executive Ashley Church, Auckland University of Technology historian Paul Moon, left-wing commentator Chris Trotter, and New Zealand Taxpayers' Union Jordan Williams. On 18 July, the Free Speech Coalition filed legal proceedings against Mayor Goff and the Auckland Council after a failed attempt to broker a deal with Goff and the council to reinstate Southern and Molyneux's speaking event.

See also

References

External links
Auckland Council official website
Auckland Transition Agency

 
Politics of the Auckland Region
City councils in New Zealand
Regional councils of New Zealand